Jennifer Morilla Bejarano (born 23 January 1989), known as Jenni Morilla, is a Spanish footballer who plays as a forward for Primera División club Sporting de Huelva.

Career
Morilla, originally from Coria del Río, started playing football aged 15 for Mairena whilst also practising basketball, tennis and athletics. In her second spell at Sevilla, she stayed with the club throughout a relegation to the Segunda División and promotion back to the Primera División, the highest tier of Spanish women's football. In May 2020, she announced her departure from Sevilla after 10 years at the club in total. That same summer she signed for Sporting de Huelva again.

References

1989 births
Living people
Spanish women's footballers
Primera División (women) players
Sevilla FC (women) players
Women's association football forwards
People from Coria del Río
Sportspeople from the Province of Seville
Sporting de Huelva players